Andris Naudužs (born 9 September 1975 in Dobele) is a former professional racing cyclist from Latvia.

Palmarès

1999 - Selle Italia (Italy/Colombia)
 Note: He joined the Selle Italia team on the first of September.

2000 - Aguardiente Nectar-Selle Italia (Colombia/Italy)
3rd National Road Race Championships
Tour du lac Leman (1.5)
 Winner
 Vuelta a Colombia (2.5)
Winner in Stage 1
Winner in Stage 2
Winner in Stage 3
Winner in Stage 4
Giro del Trentino (2.2)
 Second Place in Stage 1a

2001 - Selle Italia-Pacific (Colombia/Italy)
Stausee Rundfahrt (1.5) - 25 March
 Winner
Giro del Trentino (2.2)
 Second place in Stage 4 – 165 km - 3 May
Giro Rivera Ligure Ponente (2.4)
 Second place in Stage 1 - 155.6 km - 21 February
Tour de Langkawi (2.3)
 Second place in Stage 11 - 162.9 km - 17 February
 Second place in Stage 12 - 75.6 km criterium - 18 February
 Third place in Stage 4 - 135.5 km - 9 February

2002 - Colombia-Selle Italia (Colombia/Italy)
Tour de Senegal (2.5) - 1225 km - 14–25 October
 Overall winner
 Winner Sprint Point Competition
 First place Stage 1 – 80 km - 15 October
 First place Stage 10 – 100 km - 26 October
 Tour of Bulgaria (2.5)
 First place in Stage 2–3 September
 First place in Stage 4–5 September
 Tour de Langkawi (2.3)
 Second place in Stage 8 - 95.5 km - 8 February

2003 - CCC-Polsat (Poland)
 1st  National Road Race Championships
2nd National Time Trial Championships
Idea Mazovia Tour (2.5)
 First Place Stage 3 -  - 163.8 km - 25 July
GP de la Ville de Rennes (1.3) - 157.5 km - 6 April
 Second Place
Course de la Soliderite Olympique (2.3)
 Second Place - Stage 1 – 78 km - 2 July
Tour du Poitou Charentes et de la Vienne (2.3)
 Third place in Stage 1 – 180 km - 26 August
 Note: He joined the team on the 26th of March.

2004 - Domina Vacanze (Italy)
Stausee-Rundfahrt (1.3) - 188 km - 21 March
 Winner
Giro della Provincia di Reggio Calabria (1.3) - 184 km - 6 March
 Winner
E3 Prijs Vlaanderen (1.1) - 195 km - 27 March
 Third Place
Giro d'Italia (GT)
 Third place in Stage 10 – 146 km - 19 May

2005 - Naturino-Sapore di Mare (Italy)
Circuit de Lorraine (2.1)
Overall winner
Sprinter's Points Competition
 First Place - Stage 1 – 157 km - 27 April
 Second Place - Stage 5 - 158.5 km - 30 April
Circuit de la Sarthe (2.1)
 Second Place - Stage 1 - 197.2 km - 5 April
 Second Place - Stage 3 - 195.4 km - 7 April

External links
 
 
 
 

Latvian male cyclists
1975 births
Living people
Cyclists at the 2000 Summer Olympics
Cyclists at the 2004 Summer Olympics
Olympic cyclists of Latvia
Doping cases in cycling
Latvian sportspeople in doping cases
People from Dobele